Anthony John Emery (4 November 1927 – 5 November 2005) was an English professional footballer who played as a centre half.

Career
Born in Lincoln, Emery played for Lincoln City and Mansfield Town, making 428 appearances in the Football League.

Personal life
His father Bob and uncle Fred were also footballers.

References

1927 births
2005 deaths
English footballers
Lincoln City F.C. players
Mansfield Town F.C. players
English Football League players
Association football defenders
Sportspeople from Lincoln, England